Suphan Buri located in the central  region  of Thailand, is one of the country's 76 provinces (จังหวัด, changwat), the first-level administrative divisions. Neighbouring provinces are (from north clockwise) Uthai Thani, Chai Nat, Sing Buri, Ang Thong, Phra Nakhon Si Ayutthaya, Nakhon Pathom and Kanchanaburi. As of 2018 the province counted a population  of around 848,700, representing about 1.28% of the country's population.

Toponymy
The word suphan originates from the Sanskrit word Suvarna (Devanagari: सुवर्ण), meaning 'gold', and the word buri from Sanskrit purī (Devanagari: पुरी), meaning 'town' or 'city'. Hence the name of the province literally means 'city of gold'.

Geography
The terrain of the province is mostly low river plains, with small mountain ranges in the north and the west of the province. The southeastern part with the very low plain of the Tha Chin River is paddy rice farming area.
There is one national park, along with eight other national parks, make up region 3 (Ban Pong) of Thailand's protected areas. Phu Toei National Park,

History

Suphan Buri might be the site of the legendary Suvarnabhumi, which is mentioned in very old Buddhist writings. However the first confirmed historical settlement was in the Dvaravati period, when the city was known as Mueang Thawarawadi Si Suphannaphumi ('the Dvaravati city of Suvarnabhumi'). Its founding took place c. 877–882.  In the era of Ankorian king Jayavarman VII, inscription called Prasat Phra Khan (จารึกปราสาทพระขรรค์) was made and which mentions the name of Suvarnapura. Later it was called U Thong, and was once believed to be the home city of Prince U Thong, the founder of the Ayutthaya Kingdom. King Khun Luang Pha Ngua gave it the current name. Suphan Buri was a border city, and the site of several battles with the neighbouring Burmese.

Economy
The province is Thailand's largest producer of water chestnuts, grown mainly in Mueang Suphan Buri, Sam Chuk, and the Si Prachan Districts of the province. About half of the province's 3,000 rai of cultivated water chestnuts are found in Tambon Wang Yang of Si Prachan. The vegetable was registered as a geographical indication (GI) product of Suphan Buri in 2017. The Thai dessert thapthim krop, with water chestnuts as its main ingredient, was named one of the world's best 50 desserts in 2019 by CNN Travel.

Symbols
The provincial seal shows the elephant battle between King Naresuan the Great and the crown prince of Burma in 1592, which took place in Suphan Buri.

The provincial tree is the ebony tree (Diospyros mollis), มะเกลือ.

Administrative divisions

Provincial government
The province is divided into 10 districts (amphoes). The districts are further divided into 110 subdistricts (tambons) and 977 villages (mubans).

Local government
As of 26 November 2019 there are: one Suphan Buri Provincial Administration Organisation and 45 municipal (thesaban) areas in the province. Suphan Buri and Song Phi Nong have town (thesaban mueang) status. Further 43 subdistrict municipalities (thesaban tambon). The non-municipal areas are administered by 81 Subdistrict Administrative Organisations - SAO (ongkan borihan suan tambon).

Health 
Suphan Buri's main hospital is Chao Phraya Yommarat Hospital, operated by the Ministry of Public Health.

Transportation

Rail
Suphan Buri is at the end of a  branch line of the State Railway of Thailand's Southern Line, officially terminating at Suphan Buri railway station. The branch meets the main line at Nong Pladuk Junction near Ban Pong.

Roads
Route 340 passes through Suphan Buri, leading north to Chai Nat and south to Bang Bua Thong. Route 321 leads west and then south to Nakhon Pathom. Route 329 leads east to Bang Pahan. Route 3195 leads north-east to Ang Thong.

Human achievement index 2017

Since 2003, United Nations Development Programme (UNDP) in Thailand has tracked progress on human development at sub-national level using the Human achievement index (HAI), a composite index covering all the eight key areas of human development. National Economic and Social Development Board (NESDB) has taken over this task since 2017.

References

External links

Province page from the Tourist Authority of Thailand

Suphanburi provincial map, coat of arms and postal stamp
Suphanburi New Build.  The new twelve lakes

 
Provinces of Thailand